Semiconductor nanowire lasers are nano-scaled lasers that can be embedded on chips and constitute an advance for computing and information processing applications. Nanowire lasers are coherent light sources (single mode optical waveguides) as any other laser device, with the advantage of operating at the nanoscale. Built by molecular beam epitaxy, nanowire lasers offer the possibility for direct integration on silicon, and the construction of optical interconnects and data communication at the chip scale. Nanowire lasers are built from III–V semiconductor heterostructures. Their unique 1D configuration and high refractive index allow for low optical loss and recirculation in the active nanowire core region. This enables subwavelength laser sizes of only a few hundred nanometers. Nanowires are Fabry–Perot resonator cavities defined by the end facets of the wire, therefore they do not require polishing or cleaving for high-reflectivity facets as in conventional lasers.

Properties
Nanowire lasers can be grown site-selectively on Si/SOI wafers with conventional MBE techniques, allowing for pristine structural quality without defects. Nanowire lasers using the group-III nitride and ZnO materials systems have been demonstrated to emit in the visible and ultraviolet, however infrared at the 1.3–1.55 μm is important for telecommunication bands. Lasing at those wavelengths has been achieved by removing the nanowire from the silicon substrate. Nanowire lasers have shown pulse durations down to <1ps,  and enable repetition rates greater than 200 GHz. Also, nanowire lasers have shown to store the phase information of a pulse over 30ps when excited with subsequent pulse pairs. Mode locked lasers at the nano-scale are therefore feasible with such configurations.

See also

Semiconductor lasers
Nanowires
Molecular Beam Epitaxy
Nanolaser

References

Nanoelectronics
Semiconductors
Nanowire